Piner-Olivet Union School District has around 1,500 students and serves western Santa Rosa, California. The district has three elementary schools, one middle school, and one middle/high school.

Elementary schools
Olivet Elementary
Jack London Elementary
Schaefer Elementary

Middle schools
Piner Olivet Charter School Also known as POCS
Northwest Prep, formerly known as The Career Academy at Piner

High school
Northwest Prep, formerly known as The Career Academy at Piner

See also
 List of school districts in Sonoma County, California

References

External links
 official website

Education in Santa Rosa, California
School districts in Sonoma County, California